Roberto Viñals Contreras (date of birth unknown; died 28 March 1986) was a Mexican equestrian. He competed in two events at the 1952 Summer Olympics.

References

Date of birth unknown
1986 deaths
Mexican male equestrians
Olympic equestrians of Mexico
Equestrians at the 1952 Summer Olympics
Pan American Games medalists in equestrian
Pan American Games gold medalists for Mexico
Pan American Games bronze medalists for Mexico
Equestrians at the 1951 Pan American Games
Equestrians at the 1955 Pan American Games
Medalists at the 1951 Pan American Games
Medalists at the 1955 Pan American Games